Greek forest fires may refer to:

2007 Greek forest fires
2009 Greek forest fires
2012 Chios Forest Fire

See also
Greek fires (disambiguation)